Harpalus poussereaui is a species of ground beetle in the subfamily Harpalinae. It was described by Pierre & Mauro in 2010.

References

poussereaui
Beetles described in 2010